The 1972 United States presidential election in Vermont  took place on November 7, 1972, as part of the 1972 United States presidential election which was held throughout all 50 states and the District of Columbia. Voters chose three representatives, or electors to the Electoral College, who voted for president and vice president.

Vermont voted for incumbent Republican President Richard Nixon of California and his running mate Vice President Spiro Agnew of Maryland, defeating Democratic Senator George McGovern of South Dakota and his running mate U.S. Ambassador Sargent Shriver of Maryland.

Nixon took 62.66% of the vote to McGovern's 36.47%, a margin of 26.20%. Coming in a distant third was the People's Party candidate famed pediatrician Dr. Benjamin Spock, who took 0.54% in Vermont on the Liberty Union ballot line.

Vermont historically was a bastion of liberal Northeastern Republicanism, and by 1972 the Green Mountain State had gone Republican in every presidential election since the founding of the Republican Party, except in the Democratic landslide of 1964, when the GOP had nominated staunch conservative Barry Goldwater.

Richard Nixon was seen as a mainstream moderate Republican, and while winning nationally in a massive 49-state landslide, he easily held onto Vermont's three electoral votes. The only state McGovern carried was neighboring Massachusetts, along with the District of Columbia.

As Nixon won a historic landslide nationally, Vermont weighed in as about 3% more Republican than the nation.

Nixon won every county in Vermont, and broke 60% in every county except for Chittenden County,  the most populous county, home to the state's largest city, Burlington. Though the state wouldn't vote for another Democratic presidential candidate until 1992, no subsequent Republican who won the state was able to match Nixon's 62% vote share. Nixon's 70.16% in Lamoille County is also the last time that a Republican has won over 70% of the vote in a Vermont county.

Richard Nixon had previously won the Green Mountain State against John F. Kennedy in 1960 and then again against Hubert Humphrey in 1968.

Results

Results by county

See also
 United States presidential elections in Vermont

References

Vermont
1972
1972 Vermont elections